União Desportiva e Recreativa de Algés (abbreviated and popular form: UDRA) is a football club from the parish of Algés in Oeiras, Portugal. Currently the club plays at district league level and the main kit colours are black and white vertical stripes.

Algés (Oeiras)
Football clubs in Portugal